Bakers Falls is a waterfall on the Hudson River in Washington County, New York. It is located in the Village of Hudson Falls.

References

Waterfalls of New York (state)
Landforms of Washington County, New York
Tourist attractions in Washington County, New York